Olyokminsky District (Ölüöxüme uluuha) is an administrative and municipal district (raion, or ulus), one of the thirty-four in the Sakha Republic, Russia. It is located in the southwest of the republic and borders with Verkhnevilyuysky  District in the north, Gorny and Khangalassky Districts in the northeast, Aldansky District in the east, Neryungrinsky District in the southeast, Zabaykalsky Krai in the southwest, Irkutsk Oblast and Lensky District in the west, and with Suntarsky District in the northwest. Its administrative center is the town of Olyokminsk. Population:  27,563 (2002 Census);  The population of Olyokminsk accounts for 35.4% of the district's total population.

Geography

The main rivers of the district include the Lena with its tributaries, such as the Olyokma, Cherendey and Biryuk. The Olyokma-Chara Plateau is located to the west of the Olyokma's western bank. The Olyokma Nature Reserve is part of the district.

Climate

History
The district was established on January 9, 1930.

Demographics
As of the 2002 Census, the ethnic composition was as follows:
Russians: 48.2%
Yakuts: 41.7%
Evenks: 3.9%
Tatars: 2.3%
Ukrainians: 1.2%
Evens: 0.5%
others - 2.4%

Economy
The economy of the district is based mostly on agriculture and mining. There are deposits of gold and construction materials in the district. The only deposit of charoite known in the world is located on the district's territory.

Inhabited localities

Divisional source:

*Administrative centers are shown in bold

References

Notes

Sources

Districts of the Sakha Republic
States and territories established in 1930